The John Steele House is a historic house at 2–4 Montvale Avenue in Stoneham, Massachusetts. It is one of a few surviving 19th-century double houses in Stoneham. Built c. 1880–1885, It is a 6-bay two-story wood-frame house, with a side-gable roof, chimneys at the ends, and twin doors in the central bays under a shared bracketed hood. It is one of a series of identical rowhouses that were owned by John Steele, a major landowner in the town during that period.

The house was listed on the National Register of Historic Places in 1984.

See also
 Benjamin Hibbard Residence, another double house in Stoneham
 National Register of Historic Places listings in Stoneham, Massachusetts
 National Register of Historic Places listings in Middlesex County, Massachusetts

References

Italianate architecture in Massachusetts
Houses on the National Register of Historic Places in Stoneham, Massachusetts
Houses in Stoneham, Massachusetts
Houses completed in 1880